Battle of Leuven may refer to:

Battle of Leuven (891)
Battle of Leuven (1831)